San Miguel, officially the Municipality of San Miguel (Subanen: Benwa San Miguel; Chavacano: Municipalidad de San Miguel), is a 4th class municipality in the province of Zamboanga del Sur, Philippines. According to the 2020 census, it has a population of 19,838 people.

Geography

Barangays
San Miguel is politically subdivided into 18 barangays.

Climate

Demographics

Economy

References

External links
 San Miguel Profile at PhilAtlas.com
 [ Philippine Standard Geographic Code]
Philippine Census Information

Municipalities of Zamboanga del Sur